The football tournament at the 1991 Southeast Asian Games was held from 25 November to 4 December 1991 in Manila, Philippines.

Teams

Venues

Squad 
Football at the 1991 Southeast Asian Games – Men's team squads

Group stage

Group A

Group B

Knockout stages

Semi-finals

Bronze medal match

Gold medal match

Winners

Medalists

Notes

References 

Veroeveren, Piet. "Southeast Asian Games 1991". RSSSF.
SEA Games 1991. AFF official website

 
1991 in Philippine sport